Wolfie was an indie rock band from Champaign, Illinois. The band was active from 1996 to 2001 and toured nationally.  They released three albums, an EP, and some singles before dissolving.

Members went on to form The Like Young, Beaujolais, The National Splits, The New Constitution, and Mathlete, and Wolfie members Joe and Amenda Ziemba also had a side project, Busytoby.

Discography
 Necessary Sailing (CS) – Self Released – 1997
 Don't Turn It Off (7") – Grand Theft Autumn – 1997
 Mock House (7") – Mud Records – 1998
 Awful Mess Mystery (CD/LP) – Mud Records – 1999
 You're Lucky I'm Skinny (7") – Parasol Records – 1999
 Heavy Lady (7") – Kittridge Records – 1999
 Wolfie and the Coat and Hat (CD) – Parasol Records – 2000
 Split w/ Kincaid (7") – Kindercore Records – 2000
 Where's Wolfie? (CD/LP) – Parasol Records – 2000
 Tall Dark Hill (CD/LP) – March Records – 2001
 4-Track Rarities (MP3) – Self Released – 2003

References

External links
 Parasol Records: Wolfie
 Kittridge Records: Wolfie
 Mike Downey Discography: Guitarist of Wolfie and National Splits

Indie rock musical groups from Illinois